The 1933 Boston Red Sox season was the 33rd season in the franchise's Major League Baseball history. The Red Sox finished seventh in the American League (AL) with a record of 63 wins and 86 losses,  games behind the Washington Senators.

On February 25, 1933, Tom Yawkey bought the Red Sox for $1.25 million from J. A. Robert Quinn, and persuaded friend and former Philadelphia Athletics second baseman Eddie Collins to be the team's vice president and general manager.

There were five rainouts during the season, one game against the Senators and a four-game series against the Chicago White Sox that was cancelled due to the remnants of the 1933 Outer Banks hurricane, which passed to the southeast of New England during the third weekend of September.

Regular season

Season standings

Record vs. opponents

Opening Day lineup

Roster

Player stats

Batting

Starters by position 
Note: Pos = Position; G = Games played; AB = At bats; H = Hits; Avg. = Batting average; HR = Home runs; RBI = Runs batted in

Other batters 
Note: G = Games played; AB = At bats; H = Hits; Avg. = Batting average; HR = Home runs; RBI = Runs batted in

Pitching

Starting pitchers 
Note: G = Games pitched; IP = Innings pitched; W = Wins; L = Losses; ERA = Earned run average; SO = Strikeouts

Other pitchers 
Note: G = Games pitched; IP = Innings pitched; W = Wins; L = Losses; ERA = Earned run average; SO = Strikeouts

Relief pitchers 
Note: G = Games pitched; W = Wins; L = Losses; SV = Saves; ERA = Earned run average; SO = Strikeouts

Farm system

References

External links 
1933 Boston Red Sox team page at Baseball Reference
1933 Boston Red Sox season at baseball-almanac.com

Boston Red Sox seasons
Boston Red Sox
Boston Red Sox
1930s in Boston